Ramesh "Sunny" Balwani (born ) is an American convicted fraudster, businessman and former president and chief operating officer of Theranos, which was a privately held health technology company founded by his then-girlfriend Elizabeth Holmes. He was the second most important figure in the collapse of Theranos and its fraudulent claims to investors, that they had devised a revolutionary blood test that used very small amounts of blood such as that from a fingerstick. Starting in 2015, Theranos came under criticism in the media due to its questionable claims and practices. The company was eventually liquidated. Balwani and Holmes were criminally charged by federal authorities for operating the business as a multi-million-dollar scheme to defraud investors and patients. Holmes was found guilty and sentenced to 135 months in prison on November 18, 2022. On July 7, 2022, Balwani was found guilty on all counts. On December 7, 2022 he was sentenced to 12 years and 11 months, plus three years of probation, with a surrender date by March 15, 2023.

Early life and education 
Ramesh Balwani was born in Sindh, Pakistan into an upper middle-class Sindhi Hindu farming family. He attended Aitchison College, a prestigious boarding school in Lahore. He stayed there until 1984, receiving an education the British colonialists had designated for "youths of good family". Balwani speaks Sindhi, his native language and Urdu, Hindi and English.

His family eventually moved to India "because being a Hindu in a mostly all-Muslim country of Pakistan was very difficult" according to Balwani's personal lawyer. Later they immigrated to the United States. In the Spring 1987 semester, Balwani began undergraduate studies at the University of Texas at Austin as an international student where he was a member of the Pakistani Students Association. "He was very patriotically Pakistani," said one friend of Balwani's at the time, "He was one of us." Balwani left the campus sometime after 1991 to begin working; he would eventually complete a degree, but not until 1997 with a bachelor's in information systems.

Despite research into the question by The New York Times, it is unknown when, or why, he took the nickname "Sunny".  In official documents from the late 1990s, and on divorce papers from 2002, he was known as Ramesh, his given name. By 2012, he was signing papers at Theranos as Sunny Balwani.

Career 
In the 1990s, Balwani worked for Lotus Software and Microsoft. During Balwani's tenure at Microsoft he worked in sales. He claims to have written thousands of lines of code; however, independent investigations could not verify this, and numerous Microsoft managers who were asked about him could not remember him. While at Microsoft, he met a Japanese artist, Keiko Fujimoto, who became his wife.

In late 1999 he joined CommerceBid.com as President. It was a software development company that helped businesses buy and sell items via auctions over the burgeoning Internet. In 1999, the company was purchased by Commerce One, another business development software company with a high valuation. The buyout was done entirely with stock, and Balwani joined the board of the new company. In July 2000, Balwani sold his shares in Commerce One, netting nearly $40 million shortly before the company went out of business, just before the dot com bubble burst. He later went back to school and received a Master of Business Administration from the University of California, Berkeley in 2003. He spent another four years in a computer science graduate program at Stanford University, but dropped out in 2008.

While enrolled at Berkeley, Balwani, who was 37 at the time, met Elizabeth Holmes, who was 18 and in her senior year of high school. Holmes pursued an undergraduate degree in chemical engineering at Stanford, but later dropped out to focus full-time on Theranos.

Theranos 

Balwani joined Theranos in 2009. He ran the company's day-to-day operations as its president. He had no training in biological sciences or medical devices, which became an issue due to the absence of medical experts on the company's board of directors and Balwani's behavior. He was described by former Theranos employees as overbearing, uncompromising and so concerned about industrial espionage that he verged on paranoia.

Within Theranos, Balwani was known for using technical terms he seemingly did not understand in what others believed were attempts to appear more knowledgeable. Balwani at one point claimed "This invention [the Edison blood testing device] is going to be way up there, um, with – with the discovery of antibiotics." He once misheard "end effector" (the claw or other device at the end of an automated robot's arm) as "endofactor" (a nonsense word) and repeated the error throughout a meeting, furthermore not noticing when "Endofactor" was subsequently used as a prank in a PowerPoint presentation.

The Wall Street Journal reported in October 2015 that the Edison blood testing device by Theranos produced inaccurate medical diagnoses and results. Edison machines frequently failed quality-control checks and produced widely varying results, a finding that was corroborated in a report released in March 2016 by the federal Centers for Medicare and Medicaid Services (CMS). In April 2016, Theranos told regulators it had voided all test results from Edison machines for 2014 and 2015, as well as some other tests it ran on conventional machines.

In January 2016, the CMS sent a warning letter to Theranos after inspecting its Newark, California, laboratory. CMS regulators proposed a two-year ban on Balwani from owning or operating a blood lab after the company had not fixed problems within its California lab in March 2016.

The other charges of fraud against Theranos include claiming the company's technology was being used by the U.S. Department of Defense in combat situations despite never having been used.

Another false claim included claiming a $100 million revenue stream in 2014 that was actually $100,000.  Balwani departed from his position at Theranos in May 2016.

Legal proceedings

SEC fraud charges 
In March 2018, Balwani and Holmes were charged by the SEC with securities fraud, "raising more than $700 million from investors through an elaborate, years-long fraud in which they exaggerated or made false statements about the company's technology, business, and financial performance". Holmes settled the case out of court without admitting or denying wrongdoing, but Balwani is still in litigation as of 2022. He says he is innocent of the charges.

United States v. Ramesh "Sunny" Balwani 

On June 15, 2018, following an investigation by the U.S. Attorney's Office in San Francisco that lasted more than two years, a federal grand jury indicted president Ramesh "Sunny" Balwani and CEO Elizabeth Holmes on nine counts of wire fraud and two counts of conspiracy to commit wire fraud. Prosecutors allege that Holmes and Balwani engaged in two criminal schemes, one to defraud investors, the other to defraud patients. In March 2020, a U.S. District Court Judge ordered that Balwani will stand trial separately from Holmes. In January 2022, Holmes was found guilty on multiple counts of fraud. On July 7, 2022, Balwani was found guilty on all counts and faced up to 20 years in prison and millions of dollars in restitution. He received a sentence of 12 years 11 months in prison, plus three years of probation on December 7, 2022. He will begin serving his sentence no later than March 15, 2023.

Personal life 
He was married to Japanese artist Keiko Fujimoto. Fujimoto and Balwani lived in San Francisco before their divorce in December 2002.

Balwani was in a romantic relationship with Elizabeth Holmes during his tenure at Theranos. Holmes met him in 2002 at age 18, while still in school. He was 19 years older than Holmes and married at the time. Their relationship was not disclosed to their Theranos investors. During her trial, Holmes testified that she had been raped while she was a student at Stanford and that she had sought solace from Balwani in the aftermath of the incident. She also claimed that during her romantic relationship with Balwani, which lasted more than a decade, he was a very controlling figure and that he berated and sexually abused her. In her court testimony, Holmes stated that Balwani wanted to "kill the person" she was and make her into a "new Elizabeth". However, she later testified that Balwani had not forced her to make the false statements to investors, business partners, journalists and company directors that had been described in the case. In court filings, Balwani and his ex-wife Fujimoto have "categorically" denied abuse allegations, calling them "false and inflammatory".

Balwani was portrayed by Naveen Andrews in the 2022 miniseries The Dropout, which documented his relationship with Holmes and his role within Theranos.

References

External links 
 In the archive video, click the blank video screen to begin playing and on the sound-bar to enable sound.

1965 births
Living people
American people convicted of fraud
American people of Indian descent
American people of Pakistani descent
American people of Sindhi descent
American Hindus
American chief operating officers
American technology executives
Haas School of Business alumni
Pakistani emigrants to India
Indian emigrants to the United States
Microsoft employees
Theranos people
University of Texas at Austin alumni
Sindhi people
Indian Hindus
Pakistani Hindus
Naturalized citizens of the United States